Idol Tryouts 2 is a various artists compilation album released by Ann Arbor, Michigan-based record label Ghostly International.  It is the label's third compilation overall and the second in their Idol Tryouts series.  Idol Tryouts 2 contains tracks from artists on the label and spans the musical genres of electronica, techno, electro, tech house and trip hop.  Included in Idol Tryouts 2 is a second disc which highlights ambient music selections from Ghostly International artists.

Idol Tryouts 2 track listing

Disc one
 Solvent "Introduction to Ghosts"
 Matthew Dear "Send You Back"
 Outputmessage "Sommeil"
 Skeletons & The Girl-Faced Boys "Fit Black Man"
 Kill Memory Crash "Press + Burn"
 Dabrye "Magic Says"
 Mobius Band "Electronic Piano"
 Daniel Wang "Berlin Sunrise"
 Charles Mainer "Bang Bang Lover"
 Benoit Pioulard "Depths & the Seashore"
 Solvent "Spin Cycle"
 Lawrence "Wasting a Fall"
 Mobius Band "Loving Sounds of Static" (Junior Boys Remix)

Disc two
 Loscil "Umbra"
 Deru "Straight Speak"
 Sybarite "Sanctuary"
 Cepia "Ramp"
 Cepia "Hoarse"
 Kiln "Isthmus"
 Greg Davis "Amaranthine"
 Lusine + David Wingo "Locks"
 Aeroc "Little Something"
 Christoper Willits "Colors Shifting"
 Terre's Neu Wuss Fusion "Love on a Real Train (Risky Business)"
 Twine "Gliding in On"
 Tim Hecker "Sundown6093"
 Richard Devine "Murman"

Record label compilation albums
2006 compilation albums
Ghostly International compilation albums
Electronic compilation albums
Dance music compilation albums